This is a list of Members of Parliament (MPs) elected to the Assembly of the Republic for the 6th Parliament of the Turkish Republic of Northern Cyprus at the 2005 parliamentary election, which was held on 20 February 2005.

The list below indicates the MPs in the parties in which they were elected.

Lefkoşa

Gazimağusa

Girne

Güzelyurt

İskele

References 

Members of the Assembly of the Republic (Northern Cyprus)